The 47th Guldbagge Awards ceremony, presented by the Swedish Film Institute, honored the best Swedish films of 2011 and took place January 23, 2012, at Cirkus in Stockholm. During the ceremony, the jury presented Guldbagge Awards (commonly referred to as Bagge) in 19 categories. The ceremony was televised in the Sweden by SVT, with actress and comedian Petra Mede hosting the show for the second time in a row.

News for this year is the addition of seven new categories, including Best Editing, Costume, Sound, Makeup, Music, Art Direction and Visual Effects.

She Monkeys won three awards including Best Film and Best Screenplay. Kronjuvelerna also won three awards, all in the technical categories. Other winners included Play, Simon and the Oaks and The Black Power Mixtape 1967-1975 with two awards each, and Happy End, A One-Way Trip to Antibes, At Night I Fly, Las Palmas, A Separation and Beyond the Border with one.

The jury 
Among the members of the jury for the films of 2011, were Jannike Åhlund, Klaus Härö and Mikael Marcimain. On the Swedish Film Institute's website, can you read about the rules for the Guldbagge Awards, where you will also find information about the awards, different jury groups, in the nomination process and the choice of the winners.

Winner and nominees 
The nominees for the 47th Guldbagge Awards were announced on January 4, 2012 in Stockholm, by the Swedish Film Institute.

Films with the most nominations were Simon and the Oaks with thirteen, followed by Play with seven and Kronjuvelerna with five. The winners were announced during the awards ceremony on January 23, 2012.

Awards 

Winners are listed first and highlighted in boldface.

Multiple nominations and awards 

Thirty-four films (twenty-two features and twelve documentaries) were released in Sweden in 2011 and were eligible for nomination. Among these films, fifteen of them got at least one nomination.

The following films received one or multiple nominations:
 Thirteen: Simon and the Oaks
 Seven: Play 
 Five: Kronjuvelerna
 Four: She Monkeys
 Three: The Black Power Mixtape 1967-1975, Happy End, Stockholm East
 Two: Beyond the Border
 One: Between 2 Fires, Kyss mig, Försvunnen, A One-Way Trip to Antibes, Någon annanstans i Sverige, The Stig-Helmer story, At Night I Fly, Stora scenen

The following four films received multiple awards:
 Three: She Monkeys and Kronjuvelerna
 Two: Play, Simon and the Oaks and The Black Power Mixtape 1967-1975

References

External links 
Swedish Film Institute's site about the Guldbagge Award
Guldbagge Award on Facebook
Guldbagge Award on Twitter

2012 in Swedish cinema
2011 film awards
Guldbagge Awards ceremonies
2010s in Stockholm
January 2012 events in Europe